The United States House of Representatives elections in California, 1904 was an election for California's delegation to the United States House of Representatives, which occurred as part of the general election of the House of Representatives on November 8, 1904. Republicans won the three Democratic-held districts, giving California an all-Republican House delegation, which it would maintain until 1910.

Overview

Delegation Composition

Results

District 1

District 2

District 3

District 4

District 5

District 6

District 7

District 8

See also
59th United States Congress
Political party strength in California
Political party strength in U.S. states
United States House of Representatives elections, 1904

References
California Elections Page
Office of the Clerk of the House of Representatives

External links
California Legislative District Maps (1911-Present)
RAND California Election Returns: District Definitions

1904
United States House of Representatives
California